Greene Ridge is a partially ice-covered ridge,  long, extending northward from Martin Dome to the southern edge of Argosy Glacier in the Miller Range of Antarctica. It was named by the Advisory Committee on Antarctic Names after Charles R. Greene, Jr., a United States Antarctic Research Program ionospheric scientist at South Pole Station, 1958.

References

Ridges of Oates Land